Sisurcana brasiliana is a species of moth of the  family Tortricidae. It is found in Brazil (Santa Catarina, Paraná).

The wingspan is 18–22 mm. The ground colour of the forewings is pale brownish creamy with brownish suffusions and brown strigulation (fine streaks) and reticulation (net-like pattern). The markings are also brown. The hindwings are brown.

References

Moths described in 2004
Sisurcana
Moths of South America
Taxa named by Józef Razowski